Heard is an English surname for someone who once worked as a herdsman.  Notable people with the surname include:

 Albert Heard (1833–1890), American merchant, diplomat and author
 Alexander Heard (1917–2009), American chancellor
 Alexander S. Heard, American editor and author
 Amber Heard (born 1986), American actress
 Andreao Heard, American record producer and songwriter also known as "Fanatic"
 Andrew Heard (1958–1993), British artist
 Anneliese Heard (born 1981), Welsh triathlete
 Augustine Heard (1785–1868), American businessman
 Augustine Heard II (1827–1905), American diplomat
 Ben Heard, Australian environmental consultant and nuclear power advocate
 Betsy Heard (1759–c. 1812), Euro–African slave trader and merchant
 Bob Heard (born 1949), Australian rules footballer
 Bruce Heard (born 1957), French–American game designer
 Charlie Heard (1872–1945), American baseball player
 Clarrie Heard (1906–1990), New Zealand swimmer
 Dallas Heard (born 1985), American politician
 Daphne Heard (1904–1983), English actress and acting teacher
 Denatay Heard (born 1984), American football player
 Dwight B. Heard (1869–1929), American farmer, landowner and businessman
 Edith Heard (born 1965), British geneticist and academic
 Fats Heard (1923–1987), American musician
 Floyd Heard (born 1966), American track and field sprinter
 Fred W. Heard (born 1940), American educator and pastor
 Gabre Heard, Ethiopian army general
 Gar Heard (born 1948), American basketball player and coach
 Gerald Heard (1889–1971), British writer and philosopher
 Grant Heard (born 1978), American football coach
 Harry Heard (1920–1978), Australian rules footballer
 Hartley Heard (born 1947), English cricketer and educator
 Herman Heard (born 1961), American football player
 Isaac Heard (1730–1822), British officer of arms, sailor, and merchant
 Isaac V. D. Heard (1834-1913), American lawyer and politician
 Jay Heard (1920–1999), American baseball player
 J. C. Heard (1917–1988), American musician
 Jerrod Heard, American football player
 Jerry Heard (born 1947), American golfer
 John Heard (disambiguation), multiple people
 Josephine D. Heard (1861–1924), American poet and educator
 Josh Heard (born 1994), Welsh footballer
 Larry Heard (born 1960), American record producer and musician
 Len Heard (born 1942), English–American darts player
 Lou Heard (1909–1987), Canadian politician
 Maie Bartlett Heard (1868–1951), American collector and philanthropist
 Mark Heard (1951–1992), American singer, songwriter and record producer
 Michelle Clark-Heard (born 1968), basketball coach
 Mitchell Heard (born 1992), Canadian ice hockey player
 Nadine Agyemang-Heard (born 2002), Italian rower
 Nathan Heard (1936–2004), American author
 Oscar E. Heard (1856–1940), American jurist
 Pat Heard (born 1960), English footballer
 Paul F. Heard (1913–1964), American producer, director, and scriptwriter
 Peter Heard, English football administrator and surveyor
 Raymond Heard (born 1935), South African–Canadian journalist, editor, media executive and political strategist
 Robert Heard (1930–2014), American journalist and author
 Ronnie Heard (born 1976), American football player
 Sarah Heard (born 1983), Australian rower
 Sarah Harper Heard (1853–1919), American librarian, educator, and activist
 Shane Heard (born 1958), Australian rules footballer
 Stephen Heard (1740–1815), American politician
 Steve Heard (born 1962), English middle-distance runner
 Thomas Pinckney "Skipper" Heard (1898–1980), American athletic director
 Tom Heard (born 1993), English rugby player
 Tracy Maxwell Heard (born 1963), American politician
 Will Heard (born 1991), English singer and songwriter
 William Heard (disambiguation), multiple people
 
Fictional characters:

 Beluga Heard, character in the manga series Black Cat

English-language surnames
Occupational surnames
[Category:English-language occupational surnames]]